Liam McGrath may refer to:

 Liam McGrath (hurler, born 1974), Irish hurler for Tipperary
 Liam McGrath (hurler, born 1993), Irish hurler for Tipperary